The International Socialist Organisation is a Trotskyist organisation in Ghana. It is a member of the International Socialist Tendency led by the British Socialist Workers Party.
Communism in Ghana
International Socialist Tendency
Socialist parties in Ghana